The Cape Cod Frosty is an American sailing dinghy that was designed by Harwich, Massachusetts harbormaster Thomas Leach as a one-design racer and first built in 1984.

The Frosty is the world's smallest racing sailboat class and was designed for lightness and simplicity. It was conceived for after normal season "frostbite racing", when most owners will have already hauled out their larger racing boats for the winter. The initial construction cost was estimated at less than US$300.

Production
The design is usually amateur constructed from plans in the eastern United States and Canada and is supported by the Cape Cod Frosty Class Association. Some production boats were built in the past from fiberglass by Sailpower Corp and Star Marine. Star Marine also provided kits for amateur completion at one point. More than 1,000 boats have been completed in total.

Design
The Frosty is a racing sailboat, usually built of wood, using two  sheets of  plywood and assembled using an epoxy stitch and glue technique.

The design has a pram hull with no chines or internal framing and has only one bulkhead. It features an unstayed catboat single sail rig, with wooden or aluminum spars, a nearly plumb stem, a vertical transom, a transom-hung rudder controlled by a tiller with an extension and a retractable daggerboard. It displaces .

For sailing the design is equipped with flotation bags. A boom vang, Cunningham and mainsheet traveler are optional.

The class association notes, "this is not a boat for juniors, in fact, only experienced sailors need apply".

Operational history
In a 1994 review Richard Sherwood wrote, "this is the world’s smallest racing class — and all boats are equally slow. But when you put your big boat up for the winter, you may still compete, and perhaps on a more friendly level."

The first class championship regatta was held at the Hyannis Yacht Club in Hyannis, Massachusetts on 28 April 1985, with 21 local sailors competing in the six races. The following year it became a two-day event.

By 2001 there were 15 fleets racing the design in the eastern United States and Canada, plus an annual North American Championship.

See also
List of sailing boat types

Similar sailboats
Interclub Dinghy
Lehman Interclub
Optimist (dinghy)
Penguin (dinghy)

References

Dinghies
1980s sailboat type designs
Sailboat type designs by Thomas Leach
Sailboat types built by Sailpower Corp
Sailboat types built by Star Marine